Aaron Mitchell may refer to:

Aaron Mitchell (murderer) (1930–1967), executed for murdering a police officer in Sacramento in 1963
Aaron Mitchell (American football) (born 1956), former professional American football player 
Aaron Mitchell (basketball), basketball player
Aaron Mitchell (boxer), American middleweight boxer